"Svindlande affärer", written by Bengt Palmers, is a song performed by Pernilla Wahlgren at the movie with the same name in 1985.

The song was at Trackslistan for one week, 20th position on 3 August 1985, and Svensktoppen for 11 weeks during the period 13 October-22 December 1985. During the three first weeks, the song stayed at first position, and was the first one to top Svensktoppen when the program was restarted, after having been off-air since 13 June 1982.

A Framåt fredag parody was called Svindlande vapenaffärer, depicting the controversies of Swedish arms industry.

References

External links
Information at Svensk mediedatabas

Pernilla Wahlgren songs
Swedish-language songs
1985 songs